Laura Elena Ledesma Romo (born 15 October 1958) is a Mexican politician from the Ecologist Green Party of Mexico. From 2009 to 2012 she served as Deputy of the LXI Legislature of the Mexican Congress representing Baja California.

References

1958 births
Living people
Politicians from Baja California
Women members of the Chamber of Deputies (Mexico)
Ecologist Green Party of Mexico politicians
21st-century Mexican politicians
21st-century Mexican women politicians
Deputies of the LXI Legislature of Mexico
Members of the Chamber of Deputies (Mexico) for Baja California